Jaguar Love EP is the first release by art punk band Jaguar Love. It was released by Matador Records on June 3, 2008 in CD, mp3, and FLAC formats.

Critical reception 
Writing for MSN Music, Robert Christgau gave Jaguar Love an "A−" and preferred it to the band's debut album Take Me to the Sea (2008).

Track listing
 "Highways of Gold" - 3:41
 "My Organ Sounds Like...." - 5:09
 "Videotape Seascape" - 4:50

Personnel
 Produced, engineered and mixed by J. Clark at Two Sticks Audio.
 Drums engineered by John Goodmanson.
 Layout by Johnny Whitney/Crystal City Clothing.

References

2008 EPs
Jaguar Love albums